Dripsey GAA is a Gaelic Football and hurling club based in the village of Dripsey in Cork, Ireland. The club participates in Cork GAA competitions and in Muskerry board competitions.

History
Dripsey is the newest Gaelic Athletic Association club in Cork. The club was founded in 2004. Prior to that date, most players would have played with Inniscarra.

Achievements
 All-Ireland Junior Club Hurling Championship Winners (1) 2009
 Munster Junior Club Hurling Championship Winners (1) 2008
 Cork Junior Hurling Championship Winners (1) 2008
 Cork Junior B Football Championship Winners (1) 2005
 Mid Cork Junior A Hurling Championship Winners (1) 2008
 Mid Cork Junior A Football Championship Runners-Up 2008, 2009

External links
 Dripsey GAA website

Gaelic games clubs in County Cork
Gaelic football clubs in County Cork
Hurling clubs in County Cork